Ayub Shah Bukhari was a Sufi master in Gulshan-e-Maymar neighbourhood of Gadap Town in Karachi, Sindh, Pakistan. The Sufi shrine of Ayub Shah Bukhari is also located in Gulshan-e-Maymar.

On January 6, 2014, six corpses were recovered near the shrine of Ayub Shah Bukhari on the outskirts of Karachi. Bukhari is revered as a saint by followers of Sufism. The Tehrik-e-Taliban, who follow a very strict interpretation of Islam, consider shrine worshipping and Grave worshiping as un-Islamic and have mounted attacks on Sufi shrines and pilgrims who visit these shrines. Talibans claimed responsibility for slaying the six people in a note found by police near the bodies. Three of the dead were custodians of the Sufi saint Ayub Shah Shrine, while the remaining three came from various parts of Karachi.

See also 
 Islam in Karachi
 Sufism in Karachi
 Abdullah Shah Ghazi

References

People from Karachi
Sufis of Sindh